Joseph Strauss may refer to:
Josef Strauss (1827–1870), composer
Joseph Strauss (admiral) (1861–1948), officer of the United States Navy
Joseph Strauss (engineer) (1870–1938), chief engineer of the Golden Gate Bridge
Joe Strauss (1858–1906), baseball player

See also
Joe Straus (born 1959), Speaker of the Texas House of Representatives
Joseph Straus (born 1938), German professor of law
Franz Josef Strauss (1915–1988), German politician